Nude with Violin is a 1964 television play broadcast by the Australian Broadcasting Corporation based on the play Nude with Violin by Noël Coward. It was directed by Christopher Muir.

Plot
In Paris in 1856, a famous artist, Paul Sorodin, has died. His estranged wife and children arrive from London for his funeral. Accompanied by Sordin's manager, they arrive to discover the apartment is occupied by Sordin's valet. Questions arise as to the authenticity of Sorodin's pictures.

Cast
Terry Norris as Sebastien Lacreole
Gerda Nicolson as Jane Sorodin		
Julia Blake as Pamela
Alex Varadi as Jacob Friedland
Roma Johnstone as Anya Pavalikov
Barbara Brandon as Isobel Sorodin
Brian Hansford as Obadiah Lelwellyn
Terence Donovan as Clinton Preminger
Follie Settees as Cherry May		
Karl Lukk as Fabrice
Nick Sofokles as Lauderdale

Production
It was one of 20 TV plays produced by the ABC in 1964. Terry Norris played the role performed on stage in England by John Gielgud and Robert Helpmann in Australia.

It was designed by Alan Clarke.

Reception
The Sydney Morning Heraldsaid the production "could do no more than echo the play's half-hearted efforts... the cast that took part looked  with the desperately contrived situations."

References

External links

1960s Australian television plays
Australian Broadcasting Corporation original programming
English-language television shows
1964 television plays